The Convention on the Marking of Plastic Explosives for the Purpose of Detection is a multilateral anti-terrorism treaty that aims to prohibit and prevent the manufacture or storage of unmarked plastic explosives.

Content
A state that ratifies the Convention agrees to prohibit the manufacture, storage, transport, or entry of unmarked plastic explosives in its territory. Plastic explosives are not prohibited by the treaty, but it mandates that when they are produced they are marked with a chemical taggant (specified in the treaty's Technical Annex) which can facilitate future identification purposes.

The Convention also establishes an International Explosives Technical Commission, which is composed of experts in the field of explosives manufacturing and explosives detection. The Commission can propose amendments to the Technical Annex of the treaty.

Conclusion and ratifications
The Convention was concluded at the ICAO International Conference on Air Law in Montreal on 1 March 1991. It entered into force on 21 June 1998 after it had been ratified by 35 signatory states.

As of October 2018, the Convention has been ratified by 155 states, made up of 154 United Nations member states plus Niue.

External links
Treaty text Archived
Signatures and ratifications Archived

1991 in Canada
1991 in aviation
International Civil Aviation Organization treaties
Terrorism treaties
Treaties concluded in 1991
Treaties entered into force in 1998
Convention
Treaties of the Afghan Transitional Administration
Treaties of Albania
Treaties of Algeria
Treaties of Andorra
Treaties of Antigua and Barbuda
Treaties of Armenia
Treaties of Argentina
Treaties of Australia
Treaties of Austria
Treaties of Azerbaijan
Treaties of the Bahamas
Treaties of Bahrain
Treaties of Bangladesh
Treaties of Barbados
Treaties of Belarus
Treaties of Belgium
Treaties of Benin
Treaties of Bhutan
Treaties of Bolivia
Treaties of Bosnia and Herzegovina
Treaties of Botswana
Treaties of Brazil
Treaties of Brunei
Treaties of Bulgaria
Treaties of Burkina Faso
Treaties of Cameroon
Treaties of Canada
Treaties of Cape Verde
Treaties of Chile
Treaties of Colombia
Treaties of the Republic of the Congo
Treaties of Costa Rica
Treaties of Ivory Coast
Treaties of Croatia
Treaties of Cuba
Treaties of Cyprus
Treaties of the Czech Republic
Treaties of Denmark
Treaties of Djibouti
Treaties of the Dominican Republic
Treaties of Ecuador
Treaties of Egypt
Treaties of El Salvador
Treaties of Eritrea
Treaties of Estonia
Treaties of Fiji
Treaties of Finland
Treaties of France
Treaties of Gabon
Treaties of the Gambia
Treaties of Georgia (country)
Treaties of Germany
Treaties of Ghana
Treaties of Greece
Treaties of Grenada
Treaties of Guinea
Treaties of Guyana
Treaties of Honduras
Treaties of Hungary
Treaties of Iceland
Treaties of India
Treaties of Iraq
Treaties of Ireland
Treaties of Italy
Treaties of Jamaica
Treaties of Japan
Treaties of Jordan
Treaties of Kazakhstan
Treaties of Kenya
Treaties of Kuwait
Treaties of Kyrgyzstan
Treaties of Laos
Treaties of Latvia
Treaties of Lesotho
Treaties of Lebanon
Treaties of the Libyan Arab Jamahiriya
Treaties of Liechtenstein
Treaties of Lithuania
Treaties of Luxembourg
Treaties of Madagascar
Treaties of Malawi
Treaties of Malaysia
Treaties of the Maldives
Treaties of Mali
Treaties of Malta
Treaties of the Marshall Islands
Treaties of Mauritania
Treaties of Mexico
Treaties of Monaco
Treaties of Mongolia
Treaties of Morocco
Treaties of Mozambique
Treaties of Myanmar
Treaties of Nauru
Treaties of the Netherlands
Treaties of New Zealand
Treaties of Nicaragua
Treaties of Niger
Treaties of Nigeria
Treaties of Niue
Treaties of Norway
Treaties of Oman
Treaties of Palau
Treaties of Panama
Treaties of Paraguay
Treaties of Peru
Treaties of the Philippines
Treaties of Poland
Treaties of Portugal
Treaties of Qatar
Treaties of South Korea
Treaties of Moldova
Treaties of Romania
Treaties of Russia
Treaties of Saint Kitts and Nevis
Treaties of Saint Vincent and the Grenadines
Treaties of Samoa
Treaties of San Marino
Treaties of Saudi Arabia
Treaties of Senegal
Treaties of Serbia
Treaties of Seychelles
Treaties of Singapore
Treaties of Slovakia
Treaties of Slovenia
Treaties of South Africa
Treaties of Spain
Treaties of Sri Lanka
Treaties of the Republic of the Sudan (1985–2011)
Treaties of Suriname
Treaties of Eswatini
Treaties of Sweden
Treaties of Switzerland
Treaties of Syria
Treaties of Tajikistan
Treaties of Thailand
Treaties of North Macedonia
Treaties of Togo
Treaties of Tonga
Treaties of Trinidad and Tobago
Treaties of Tunisia
Treaties of Turkey
Treaties of Turkmenistan
Treaties of Uganda
Treaties of Ukraine
Treaties of the United Arab Emirates
Treaties of the United Kingdom
Treaties of Tanzania
Treaties of the United States
Treaties of Uruguay
Treaties of Uzbekistan
Treaties of Vanuatu
Treaties of Yemen
Treaties of Zambia
Treaties establishing intergovernmental organizations
Treaties extended to Greenland
Treaties extended to British Hong Kong
Treaties extended to Guernsey
Treaties extended to Jersey
Treaties extended to the Isle of Man
Treaties extended to the Cayman Islands
Treaties extended to the Falkland Islands
Treaties extended to Montserrat
Treaties extended to the British Virgin Islands
Treaties extended to Aruba
Treaties extended to the Caribbean Netherlands
Treaties extended to Hong Kong